Derbyshire County Cricket Club in 1937 was the cricket season when the English club Derbyshire had been playing for sixty six years. It was their thirty-ninth season in the County Championship and they came third after winning the Championship in 1936.

1937 season

Derbyshire played 28 games in the County Championship, and one match against the touring New Zealanders. They won 15 matches including the game against the New Zealanders and lost six to finish third in the County Championship.

Robin Buckston took over the captaincy having last played for the club in the 1928 season. Denis Smith was top scorer. Tommy Mitchell took most wickets but Bill Copson made a particular impression taking eight wickets for eleven runs against Warwickshire in the first innings at Derby which included four wickets with successive balls. Worthington also played for England in Test matches touring Australia.

Albert Rhodes began his long and successful bowling career for Derbyshire during the season. The only other newcomer, Howard Sherwin played one career first class match for the club in 1937.

Matches

{| class="wikitable" style="width:100%;"
|-
! style="background:#efefef;" colspan="6"| List of matches
|- style="background:#efefef;"
!No.
!Date
!V
!Result 
!Margin
!Notes
|-
|1
|1 May 1937
|Lancashire  Old Trafford, Manchester 
| style="background:#fc0;"|Drawn
|
| T S Worthington 103; Paynter 150; Pollard 6-76; T. B. Mitchell 6-73
|- 
|2
|8 May 1937
| Worcestershire   County Ground, New Road, Worcester  
| style="background:#f00;"|Lost 
| 3 wickets
| Martin 5-69
|- 
|3
 |12 May 1937
| Surrey  Kennington Oval 
| style="background:#fc0;"|Drawn
|
| 
|- 
|4
|15 May 1937
| Essex   County Ground, Chelmsford  
| style="background:#0f0;"|Won 
| 74 runs
| T Smith 5-86 and 6-35; L F Townsend 5-49 
|- 
|5
 |22 May 1937
| Kent  County Ground, Derby  
| style="background:#0f0;"|Won 
| 82 runs
| Wright 6-73; Watt 6-34 
|- 
|6
 |26 May 1937
|  Somerset  Rutland Recreation Ground, Ilkeston 
| style="background:#0f0;"|Won 
| 7 wickets
| T. B. Mitchell 6-34; Andrews 5-28
|- 
|7
 |29 May 1937
| Yorkshire Queen's Park, Chesterfield 
| style="background:#f00;"|Lost 
| 6 wickets
| T. B. Mitchell 6-101
|- 
|8
 |2 Jun 1937
|  Lancashire  The Town Ground, Burton-on-Trent 
| style="background:#fc0;"|Drawn
|
|Phillipson 5-62; W H Copson 5-73; Sibbles 5-78
|- 
|9
|5 Jun 1937
|  New Zealand cricket team in England in 1937   County Ground, Derby 
| style="background:#0f0;"|Won 
| 202 runs
| A E Alderman 112; T. B. Mitchell 5-101 and 5-75
|- 
|10
|9 Jun 1937
|HampshireCounty Ground, Southampton  
| style="background:#0f0;"|Won 
| 199 runs
| Herman 5-56; G H Pope 5-34
|- 
|11
|12 Jun 1937
| Sussex  Cricket Field Road Ground, Horsham  
| style="background:#0f0;"|Won 
| 281 runs
| T S Worthington 133; A E Alderman 103; Langridge 102; Hammond 5-86
|- 
|12
|19 Jun 1937
| Yorkshire  Bramall Lane, Sheffield  
| style="background:#f00;"|Lost 
| Innings and 99 runs
| Hutton 271; D Smith 158; Turner 5-45; 
|- 
|13
 |23 Jun 1937
| Hampshire Queen's Park, Chesterfield 
| style="background:#fc0;"|Drawn
|
| D Smith  140; Pothecary 115; Arnold 105; T. B. Mitchell 5-101;
|- 
|14
 |26 Jun 1937
|  Gloucestershire  Park Road Ground, Buxton
| style="background:#0f0;"|Won 
| Innings and 133 runs
| T R Armstrong 7-36; Goddard 5-119 
|- 
|15
 |3 Jul 1937
| Warwickshire  Edgbaston, Birmingham 
| style="background:#fc0;"|Drawn
|
| Wyatt 232; Dollery 128; Hollies 6-50
|- 
|16
 | 7 Jul 1937
|  Surrey County Ground, Derby
| style="background:#fc0;"|Drawn
|
| Squires 139; G H Pope 122; Gover 5-70
|- 
|17
 |10 Jul 1937
| Leicestershire Queen's Park, Chesterfield
| style="background:#0f0;"|Won 
|Innings and 199 runs
| A E Alderman 175; D Smith 121; T. B. Mitchell 6-50
|- 
|18
 |14 Jul 1937
| Somerset County Ground, Taunton  
| style="background:#0f0;"|Won 
| 118 runs
| L F Townsend 110 and 5-44; AEG Rhodes 6-38
|- 
|19
 |17 Jul 1937
|  Warwickshire  County Ground, Derby 
| style="background:#0f0;"|Won 
| 5 wickets
| Hill 105; W H Copson 8-11; Mayer 5-83 and 5-39
|- 
|20
 |24 Jul 1937
|  Nottinghamshire Queen's Park, Chesterfield
| style="background:#0f0;"|Won 
| Innings and 23 runs
| T. B. Mitchell 6-74
|- 
|21
 |31 Jul 1937
| Essex Rutland Recreation Ground, Ilkeston
| style="background:#f00;"|Lost 
| 6 wickets
| G H Pope 151; W H Copson 5-99; Farnes 7-41; T Smith 6-130
|- 
|22
 |4 Aug 1937
| Northamptonshire  County Ground, Northampton 
| style="background:#fc0;"|Drawn
|
| Timms 116 
|- 
|23
 |7 Aug 1937
|  Northamptonshire  Queen's Park, Chesterfield  
| style="background:#0f0;"|Won 
| 9 wickets
| D Smith 104; G H Pope 101 and 6-43; T. B. Mitchell 6-63 
|- 
|24
 |11 Aug 1937
| Gloucestershire  College Ground, Cheltenham  
| style="background:#f00;"|Lost 
| Innings and 84 runs
| Allen 128; L F Townsend 5-59; Goddard 7-104 and 5-41; Sinfield 5-36
|- 
|25
 |14 Aug 1937
| Nottinghamshire  Trent Bridge, Nottingham  
| style="background:#fc0;"|Drawn
|
| D Smith 202; Keeton 101 
|- 
|26
 |18 Aug 1937
|  Sussex   County Ground, Derby  
| style="background:#0f0;"|Won 
| 9 wickets
| T S Worthington 238; Langridge 123; W H Copson 8-64; T. B. Mitchell 5-87
|- 
|27
 | 21 Aug 1937
|  Worcestershire Queen's Park, Chesterfield 
| style="background:#0f0;"|Won 
| 45 runs
| Kimpton 106
|- 
|28
 |25 Aug 1937
| Leicestershire Bath Grounds, Ashby-de-la-Zouch 
| style="background:#0f0;"|Won 
| 32 runs
| Prentice 131; Flamson 6-50;  
|- 
|29
 |28 Aug 1937
| Kent  Cheriton Road Sports Ground, Folkestone 
| style="background:#f00;"|Lost 
| 100 runs
| Ames 108; A V Pope 5-85; G H Pope 5-35
|-

Statistics

County Championship batting averages

County Championship bowling averages

Wicket-keeper

H Elliott Catches 44 Stumping 9 
A E Alderman Catches 17, Stumping 1

See also
Derbyshire County Cricket Club seasons
1937 English cricket season

References

1937 in English cricket
Derbyshire County Cricket Club seasons
English cricket seasons in the 20th century